The Syrian Revolutionary Command Council was an alliance of 72 Syrian rebels factions involved in the Syrian Civil War that was formed on 3 August 2014 and remained active throughout 2015.

The aim of the council was to increase the coordination and unity between the different groups, with the council planned to be divided into regional fronts that will be led by councils made up of representatives from the different factions, similar to how the Free Syrian Army was structured. The signatories represent both secular and Islamist groups; however al-Qaeda's al-Nusra Front and some of its allies were excluded. Initially Ahrar ash-Sham was also excluded, however the group did join the alliance in mid August 2014. The group announced its charter on 4 October 2014. It held its first formal meeting in Gaziantep, Turkey on 29 November 2014.

Conflict within the coalition
Early on in the coalition's existence, tensions existed between moderate rebels and al-Qaeda-affiliated groups. As part of the al-Nusra Front–SRF/Hazzm Movement conflict, the al-Nusra Front stormed the bases of the Ansar Brigades, part of the Syrian Revolutionaries Front, in the Idlib Governorate and the Justice Front in Hama Governorate on 28 November 2014 as the Syrian Revolutionary Command Council was holding its first formal meeting in Turkey. Although Jabhat al-Nusra was excluded from the coalition, many of its allies not only were included but were assigned executive positions.The close relationship between Islamist groups and al-Nusra Front was demonstrated as the two routed groups, both of which were receiving U.S. support through a covert CIA program, were forced to delivered their weapons to Ahrar ash-Sham as part of their surrender to the al-Nusra Front.

Immediately following the first formal meeting of the Syrian Revolutionary Command Council, Col. Muhammad Hallak expressed skepticism toward the October document on which the new group is based, saying it was written to ensure an Islamist government after Assad is toppled. Col. Hallak was quoted as saying: “The covenant itself doesn't mention the idea of free elections and most of the groups represented in the executive office don’t believe in the original democratic values of the revolution".

In early December 2014, the Hazzm Movement withdrew its affiliation from the Syrian Revolutionary Command Council as a result of clashes between it and the al-Nusra Front in Syria. In the same time period, the southern branch of the Syria Revolutionaries Front declared that they have no connection to the Syrian Revolutionary Command Council. The Hazzm Movement and the Syria Revolutionaries Front had been routed in the northern province of Idlib by al-Nusra Front and its allies in November.

As of late 2015, the council is no longer active.

References

External links
 Syrian Revolutionary Command Council YouTube Channel (most recent post 24 June 2015)
 Syrian Revolutionary Command Council Twitter account (most recent post 29 October 2015)

Anti-government factions of the Syrian civil war
Free Syrian Army
Military units and formations established in 2014
Military units and formations disestablished in 2015